The Roman Catholic Diocese of Santa Rosa de Lima (erected 27 April 1996) is a suffragan diocese of the Archdiocese of Guatemala.

Ordinaries

Julio Amílcar Bethancourt Fioravanti (1996–2006)
Bernabé de Jesús Sagastume Lemus, O.F.M. Cap. (2007–2021)
José Cayetano Parra Novo, O.P. (2021–present)

External links and references

Santa Rosa de Lima
Santa Rosa De Lima
Santa Rosa De Lima
Roman Catholic Ecclesiastical Province of Santiago de Guatemala